Vincent Taylor  (1887–1968) was a Methodist biblical scholar and theologian. He was elected to the Fellowship of the British Academy in 1954, specializing in theology. During his career, he was both Principal of Wesley College, Headingley, Leeds and, from 1930–58, Ferens Professor of New Testament Language and Literature there. He was also Examiner in Biblical Theology, London University. He is described as "one of the outstanding New Testament scholars of his day and theologian of great renown and influence" with an "immense" literary output. According to the British Academy, his principal publications were Jesus and his sacrifice: a study of the Passion-sayings (1937), The atonement in New Testament teaching (1940) and The Gospel according to St Mark (1952).

In 1954 Taylor was the president of the Studiorum Novi Testamenti Societas (SNTS). There was a daughter from his marriage.

Bibliography
Books
The Gospel According to Saint Mark (1952) Macmillan & Company
The Formation of the Gospel Tradition (1935) Macmillan & Company
Forgiveness and Reconciliation: A Study in New Testament Theology (1956) Macmillan
New Testament Essays (1970) Epworth Press
The Atonement in New Testament Teaching (1940) Epworth Press
Jesus and his Sacrifice: a Study of the Passion-sayings in the Gospels (1937) Macmillan & Company
The Life and Ministry of Jesus (1955) Abingdon Press
The Names of Jesus (1953) Macmillan
The Gospels: A Short Introduction (1962) Epworth Press
The Person of Christ in New Testament Teaching (1958) Macmillan
The Cross of Christ: Eight Public Lectures (1956) Macmillan. (delivered at Drew University, Madison, New Jersey : 1955–6.)
Text of the New Testament: A Short Introduction. (1961) St. Martin's Press
The Passion Narrative of St Luke: A Critical and Historical Investigation edited by Owen E. Evans (2004) Cambridge University Press The book defends and develops the argument for a non-Markan basis for the Gospel of Luke which he first presented in 1926.
The Epistle to the Romans (1955) Epworth Press
Behind the Third gospel: a study of the Proto-Luke hypothesis (1926) Clarendon Press
The Historical Evidence for the Virgin Birth  (1920) Clarendon Press
Doctrine and Evangelism (1953) Epworth Press
The Doctrine of the Holy Spirit: Four Lectures by Members of the Staff of Wesley College, Headingley coauthors Howard Watkin-Jones, Harold Roberts (1941) Epworth Press
The Origin of the Markan Passion Sayings (1970) Epworth Press
The First Draft of St. Luke's Gospel (1927) Society for Promoting Christian Knowledge

References

1887 births
1968 deaths
20th-century Christian biblical scholars
Arminian theologians
British biblical scholars
Fellows of the British Academy
Methodist biblical scholars
Methodist theologians